Tiddington may refer to two places in England:
Tiddington, Oxfordshire
Tiddington, Warwickshire